Vladislav Naydenov (Bulgarian: Владислав Найденов; born 29 November 2001) is a Bulgarian footballer who plays as a forward for Ludogorets Razgrad.

Career
Naydenov completed his league debut for Ludogorets Razgrad on 26 May 2021 in a match against CSKA 1948.

References

External links
 

2001 births
Living people
Bulgarian footballers
Bulgaria youth international footballers
PFC Ludogorets Razgrad II players
PFC Ludogorets Razgrad players
First Professional Football League (Bulgaria) players
Association football forwards
People from Vratsa